Patrick Wain Thomas (born January 26, 1983) is a former American football linebacker. He played college football at North Carolina State and was drafted into the National Football League (NFL) in 2005 to play for the Jacksonville Jaguars.

Early life
Thomas was born in Miami, Florida.

College career
Thomas attended North Carolina State University. In 50 career games at North Carolina State University with 36 starts, he recorded 334 tackles, 38 tackles for a loss, 15.5 sacks and five forced fumbles.

Professional career
Thomas was drafted by the Jacksonville Jaguars in the 6th round (20th pick) of the 2005 NFL Draft.

References

1983 births
Living people
American football linebackers
Buffalo Bills players
Jacksonville Jaguars players
Kansas City Chiefs players
NC State Wolfpack football players
Omaha Nighthawks players
Miami Killian Senior High School alumni
Players of American football from Miami